CPCM may refer to:

Certified Professional Contracts Manager (See National Contract Management Association)
Digital Video Broadcasting Content Protection & Copy Management